Carlos Alfredo Orejuela Quiñónez (born 14 March 1993), is an Ecuadorian professional footballer who plays as a striker for Chapecoense.

Club career
Carlos Orejuela made his professional debut on 30 January 2011 for CD Olmedo against LDU Quito in a 1-0 victory.

External links
 
 
 Stats/career at Teradeportes.com

1993 births
Living people
Sportspeople from Esmeraldas, Ecuador
Association football forwards
Ecuadorian footballers
C.D. Olmedo footballers